Shareena Clanton (born 1990) is an Australian film, television and theatre actress. She is known for her role as Doreen Anderson on the television drama series Wentworth (2013–2017).

Personal life
Clanton was born in Perth, Western Australia. She is of Yamatji, Noongar, Gidja, Cherokee, Blackfoot and African-Australian descent.

She currently resides in Melbourne, Victoria.

Career and racism controversy
Clanton has starred in multiple television series including Redfern Now, Wentworth and Joe vs. Carole. 

Clanton would appear on an episode of Q and A where she said Indigenous Voices deserved a place in parliament.  

er most recent role was Sheila Canning 2 in the soap opera Neighbours. Prior to her first on-screen appearance on the show, Clanton made public her displeasure about working on the show due to racism. According to Clanton, an unnamed cast member taunted her about her ethnicities twice and was not only defended by another cast member, but Clanton's rebuke of the actor resulted in Clanton being told she made the other cast members "uncomfortable". In the weeks that followed, Fremantle Australia began an investigation into these allegations. Simultaneously, former cast members Sharon Johal, Meyne Wyatt (who is also of Aboriginal ancestry), Remy Hii, Menik Gooneratne and Sachin Joab also came forward with allegations of racism.

The investigation into the racism scandal was concluded in late 2021 and the announcement came just days after show released a statement on the show ending. However the findings were not made public., Neighbours has since been renewed.

Clanton would voice the character of Deb in Childish Deano and would join the filming for upcoming dramas The Lost Flowers and Last Days of the Space Age.

Filmography

Film

Television

References

External links 
 
 

Living people
1990 births
21st-century Australian actresses
Actresses from Perth, Western Australia
Australian film actresses
Australian people of African-American descent
Australian people of Native American descent
Australian television actresses
Indigenous Australian actresses
Noongar people
Australian people of Cherokee descent
People of Blackfoot descent
Television controversies in Australia